Burress is a surname. Notable people with the surname include:

Hannibal Buress (born 1983), American comedian
Hedy Burress (born 1973), American actress
Plaxico Burress (born 1977), American football player
Withers A. Burress (1894–1977), American general
William Burress (1915–1939), American actor

See also
Burris (surname)